Reginald Henry Phelps (August 20, 1909 – September 28, 2006) was the Chairman of Commission on Extension Courses and Director of the University Extension at Harvard University from 1949 to 1975.  He was the fourth person to hold the position.  He graduated from Harvard University (A.B. summa cum laude in 1930, A.M. in 1933, and Ph.D. in 1947).

References

1909 births
2006 deaths
Harvard College alumni
Harvard University alumni
Harvard Extension School faculty
Harvard University administrators
20th-century American academics